The 2001–02 season was Boavista Futebol Clube's 88th competitive season, 33rd consecutive season in the top flight of Portuguese football, and 98th year in existence as a football club.

Boavista went into the 2001–02 season as the defending champions of the Primeira Liga, after claiming their first league title in the 2000–01 season. As winners of the 2000–01 Primeira Liga, Os Axadrezados qualified for the 2001 Supertaça Cândido de Oliveira and the 2001–02 UEFA Champions League group stage.

The 2001–02 season started with a defeat for the Porto side. As Panteras lost to Porto at the Estádio do Rio Ave FC in the Supertaça Cândido de Oliveira after a first half headed goal from central defender Jorge Andrade. In domestic league action, the Porto-based side were unable to regain the league title for a second consecutive season after finishing second, five points behind Sporting CP. In the Taça de Portugal, As Panteras''' campaign proved to be a disappointing one after being eliminated in the fifth round by Alverca.

In Boavista's European campaign, the side progressed through the first UEFA Champions League group stage round after finishing second with eight points behind English side Liverpool in a group which also contained German side Borussia Dortmund and Ukrainian champions Dynamo Kyiv. Os Axadrezados were eliminated in the next group stage round after finishing third in a group which contained Manchester United, Bayern Munich and Nantes.

Squads
First team squadStats as of the end of the 2001–02 season. Games played and goals scored only refers to appearances and goals in the Primeira Liga.Competitions
Legend

Overall

Competition record

Supertaça Cândido de Oliveira

Primeira Liga

League table

Results summary

Results by round

Matches

Taça de Portugal

UEFA Champions League

First group stage

Second group stage

Player information
Appearances and goalsAs of the end of the 2001–02 season.|-
! colspan="15" style="background:#dcdcdc; text-align:center;"| Goalkeepers

|-
! colspan="15" style="background:#dcdcdc; text-align:center;"| Defenders

|-
! colspan="15" style="background:#dcdcdc; text-align:center;"| Midfielders

|-
! colspan="15" style="background:#dcdcdc; text-align:center;"| Forwards

|}

Clean sheetsAs of the end of the 2001–02 season.Transfers
In

Out

Disciplinary recordAs of the end of the 2001–02 season.OverviewAs of the end of the 2001–02 season.''

References

Boavista F.C. seasons
Boavista